The Tura, also known as Dolgaya (Long River) is a historically important Siberian river which flows eastward from the central Ural Mountains into the Tobol, a part of the Ob basin. The main town on it is Tyumen.

Description
From about 1600 to 1750 the Tura was the main entry point into Siberia. Most people and goods entering or leaving passed through the customs house at Verkhoturye. There are a number of mining towns in the upper Tura basin.

Geography
It is located in the Sverdlovsk Oblast and Tyumen Oblast in Russia. The Tura is navigable within  of its mouth. It freezes up in late October through November and stays under the ice until April or the first half of May.

The Tura basin is bounded on the west by the Ural Mountains with the city of Perm, on the north by the Tavda basin, on the east by the Tobol with the city of Tobolsk and on the south by the Iset basin with the city of Yekaterinburg.

The Tura flows north through Verkhnyaya Tura and Nizhnyaya Tura, receives an east-flowing river from the mining town of Kachkanar, flows east past Verkhoturye, turns east-southeast, receives the Tagil from the west, passes Turinsk, receives the east-flowing Nitsa, passes Tyumen, turns directly east, receives the east-flowing Pyshma from the south and joins the Tobol River southwest of Tobolsk.

The Tura basin is fan-shaped with the Tura on the north side and the Pyshma on the south.

References 

Rivers of Sverdlovsk Oblast
Rivers of Tyumen Oblast
Ural Mountains